Virgil Wagner (February 27, 1922 - August 22, 1997) was an award-winning, all-star and Grey Cup champion Canadian football halfback for the Montreal Alouettes. He was inducted into the Canadian Football Hall of Fame in 1980.

1922 births
1997 deaths
Sportspeople from Belleville, Illinois
Canadian Football Hall of Fame inductees
Montreal Alouettes players
Millikin Big Blue baseball players
Millikin Big Blue football players
Millikin Big Blue men's basketball players
Canadian football quarterbacks
American players of Canadian football
Players of American football from Illinois
American men's basketball players